CVISD may refer to:
 Chama Valley Independent School District (New Mexico)
 Channelview Independent School District (Texas)